During the 1998–99 English football season, Sheffield United competed in the Football League First Division.

Season summary
The 1998–99 season saw more managerial change, with Steve Bruce taking over first team affairs. The Blades challenged once again for a play-off place but eventually finished eighth. However, there was drama in the FA Cup where the Blades were controversially beaten by Arsenal when Bruce attempted to take his team off the pitch, claiming that Arsenal had broken an unwritten rule of sportsmanship by failing to return the ball to the Blades, who had intentionally kicked it out of play to allow an injured player to be attended to. Although the game eventually continued to a finish, it was later declared void and replayed; United lost. In May, Bruce resigned after just one season in charge, citing turmoil in the club's boardroom and a shortage of funds for transfers.

Final league table

Results
Sheffield United's score comes first

Legend

Football League First Division

FA Cup

League Cup

Players

First-team squad
Squad at end of season

References

Notes

Sheffield United F.C. seasons
Sheffield United